Tubod is the name of two places in the Philippines:

Tubod, Lanao del Norte
Tubod, Surigao del Norte